Jaramillo is a family name of Spanish origin. It may refer to the following people:

 Annabelle Jaramillo, American politician
 Carlos Jaramillo (b. 1961), Colombian road cyclist 
 Debbie Jaramillo (b. 1952), mayor of Santa Fe, New Mexico
 Elisa Bravo Jaramillo, shipwrecked in 1849 in Chile and rumoured to have been captured
 Fabio Jaramillo (b. 1967), Colombian road cyclist 
 Ignacio Gómez Jaramillo (1910-1970), Colombian artist 
 Jason Jaramillo (b. 1982), American baseball catcher
 Julio Jaramillo (1935–1978), Pasillo performer
 Leonardo Jaramillo, Spanish mannerist painter, active in the 17th-century in the Viceroyalty of Peru
 Lucy Jaramillo (b. 1983), Ecuadorian hurdler
 Luis Jaramillo (b. 1988), Panamanian football player
 Mari-Luci Jaramillo (1928–2019), U.S. ambassador to Honduras
 Mauricio Jaramillo, Former commander of FARC
Paulina Jaramillo, Colombian-American engineer
 Rubén Jaramillo, Mexican revolutionary
 Rudy Jaramillo (b. 1950), hitting coach for the Texas Rangers (baseball)
 Stephanie Jaramillo (b. 1982), American boxer
 Virginia Jaramillo, Borough Mayor of Delegación Cuauhtémoc